Monogram is a Combine by American artist Robert Rauschenberg, made from 1955-1959. It consists of a stuffed Angora goat with its midsection passing through an automobile tire. Critic Jorg von Uthmann described it as Rauschenberg's most famous work in the Huffington Post. In 1965, Pontus Hultén purchased the artwork for the collection of the Moderna Museet in Stockholm.

History
Rauschenberg created a series of artworks between 1954 and 1964 that merge aspects of both traditional painting and sculpture. He coined the term “Combine” to describe this new artistic category. Monogram typifies the idea of the Combine as a free-standing sculptural artwork that also incorporates a painted canvas.

The artist first saw the stuffed Angora goat in the window of a secondhand furniture store at Seventh Avenue in New York. He bought it for $15 which was all of the money that he had on him at the time. Over the next four years (1955–1959), Monogram evolved through three different stages, which are documented in several studies and photographs. The title came from the union of the goat and tire, which reminded the artist of the interweaving letters in a monogram.

Monogram’s Multiple Forms 
From 1955 to 1959, Monogram took on three different incarnations. In the first iteration (1955–1956), the goat was poised on a shelf that was connected to a wall-mounted painting that later became Rhyme (1956). According to Calvin Tomkins, this version was eventually altered because Rauschenberg was dissatisfied that the goat could only be viewed from one side. 

In 1956, Rauschenberg reconstructed Monogram. In this second state, the goat was encircled by a tire with its tread repainted white and was standing on a narrow wooden platform with a vertical extension at its posterior. In this second state of Monogram, one side of the vertical panel is painted and collaged. Rauschenberg was unsatisfied with this version, as he felt that the goat appeared to be pulling the painting.

In the third and final incarnation of Monogram (1959), following the suggestion of Jasper Johns, Rauschenberg placed a square panel on casters on the floor and centered the goat, as if in a pasture.

Analysis
Critic Robert Hughes wrote on the work’s homoerotic themes and subtext; he claims, “One looks at it remembering that the goat is an archetypal symbol of lust, so Monogram is the most powerful image of anal intercourse ever to emerge from the rank psychological depths of modern art. Yet it is innocent, too, and sweet, and (with its cascading ringlets) weirdly dandified: a hippy goat, a few years before the 1960s. Fifty years after its creation, it remains one of the great, complex emblems of modernity, as unforgettable (in its way) as the flank of Cézanne's mountain, the cubist kitchen table or the wailing woman in Guernica.”

Kenneth Bendiner has interpreted the work as ‘a specific re-working’ of the Pre-Raphaelite painter William Holman Hunt’s The Scapegoat.

Art critic Catherine Craft said of the work: “Not surprisingly, Monogram shocked contemporary viewers. Still, there is also a strangely poignant beauty to its acquiescent, eternally patient goat. Some observers have associated it with an animal awaiting sacrifice. Nevertheless, with its horns and long, shimmering coat it also recalls the Feticci Personali [series of hanging ‘fetish’ assemblages of animal fur, rope, wood and various small objects] Rauschenberg made in Italy."

References

1950s sculptures
Sculptures in Sweden
Goats in art
Works by Robert Rauschenberg
Taxidermy art
Collections of the Moderna Museet